Þórir is an Icelandic given name. It may refer to:

Þórir, mononym for 12th-century Norwegian Benedictine monk known as Theodoric the Monk
Þórir Georg Jónsson, Icelandic singer songwriter known by the pseudonym My Summer As A Salvation Soldier
Þórir Jökull Steinfinnsson (born ?), Icelandic 13th century warrior and possibly a skald
Þórir Ólafsson (born 1979), Icelandic handball player
Þórir Jónsson (born 1952), Icelandic former footballer
Þórir Þorbjarnarson (born 1998), Icelandic basketball player
Thorir (king), legendary ruler of Götaland; see King of the Geats
Thorir Hergeirsson (born 1964), Icelandic handball coach
Thorir Hund (AKA Þórir hundr,  – after 1030), chief in Hålogaland
Tomrair (died 848), Viking jarl, also known as Þórir, Thorir, and Thórir

Icelandic masculine given names